The British Caspian Flotilla was a naval force of the Royal Navy established in the Caspian Sea in 1918. It was part of the allied intervention in the Russian Civil War. The flotilla initially reported to the Rear-Admiral Commanding, Black Sea, Caspian Sea and Sea of Marmora until 1919.

History

The decision to form the force was made on 11 July 1918 at the British military HQ in Baghdad. Its purpose was twofold:
 To seize Krasnovodsk, the east coast terminal of the Trans-Caspian railway, and hence support the British Malleson Mission which was intervening in Turkmenistan.
 To prevent Baku and the oilfields around it from falling onto the hands of the Germans or the Ottoman Empire.
The force was established under the command of Commodore David Norris in September 1918. Norris traveled by road from Baghdad to Enzeli with a convoy of lorries transporting naval guns. In January 1919 he was reinforced by 12 Coastal Motor Boats sent by train from Batumi the Black Sea. These ships were then armed with the naval guns, officered by British officers with a crew guarded by Royal Marines.

The flotilla maintained bases at Enzeli and Krasnovodsk, and in addition facilitated lines of communication between British land units in Baku, Petrovsk (Chechen Island), Fort Alexandrovsk.

The flotilla was successful in the Battle of Alexandrovsky Fort in May 1919 against a Bolshevik flotilla.

The Flotilla included: 
 HMS Kruger (flagship)
 HMS Venture
 HMS Asia
 HMS Windsor Castle
 HMS Emile Nobel
 HMS Orlionoch which for a period hosted No. 266 Squadron RAF

References

Footnotes

Sources
 Clifford Kinvig (2007), Churchill's Crusade, Hambledon & London, .
 Review. Naval (1919-20) The Royal Navy on the Caspian, 1918–1919". 
 Halpern, Paul (2013). The Mediterranean Fleet, 1919–1929. Ashgate Publishing.

External links

Royal Navy flotillas
Military units and formations of the Royal Navy in World War I
Russian Civil War
Military units and formations established in 1918
Military units and formations disestablished in 1920
Naval forces in the Caspian Sea